This is a list of lighthouses in the province of British Columbia, Canada.

Lighthouses

See also

List of lighthouses in Canada

References

External links

 
 List of Lights, Buoys and Fog Signals Canadian Coast Guard. Retrieved 19 March 2017
 British Columbia Canada Lighthouses Lighthouses Friends. Retrieved 19 March 2017

British Columbia

Lighthouses